Kurugondla Ramakrishna (born 1964) is the Telugu Desam Party member of the Andhra Pradesh Legislative Assembly representing Venkatagiri constituency, Nellore district. He retained his seat in the 2014 election.

References

Living people
1964 births
YSR Congress Party politicians